Miami University (informally Miami of Ohio or simply Miami) is a public research university in Oxford, Ohio. The university was founded in 1809, making it the second-oldest university in Ohio (behind Ohio University, founded in 1804) and the 10th oldest public university (32nd overall) in the United States. The school's system comprises the main campus in Oxford, as well as regional campuses in nearby Hamilton, Middletown, and West Chester. Miami also maintains an international boarding campus, the Dolibois European Center in Differdange, Luxembourg. It is classified among "R2: Doctoral Universities – High research activity".

Miami University provides a liberal arts education; it offers more than 120 undergraduate degree programs and over 60 graduate degree programs within its 7 schools and colleges in architecture, business, engineering, humanities and the sciences. In its 2021 edition, U.S. News & World Report ranked the university 103rd among universities in the United States, as well as 46th nationally among public universities. Miami University is also ranked as having the 25th-best undergraduate teaching nationally. Miami was one of the original eight Public Ivy schools, a group of publicly funded universities considered as providing a quality of education comparable to those of the Ivy League.

Miami University has a long tradition of Greek life; five social Greek-letter organizations were founded at the university earning Miami the nickname "Mother of Fraternities". Today, Miami University hosts over 50 fraternity and sorority chapters, and approximately one-third of the undergraduate student population are members of the Greek community. Forbes ranked the city of Oxford first on its 2016 list of the best college towns in the United States.

Miami's athletic teams compete in the National Collegiate Athletic Association (NCAA) Division I and are collectively known as the Miami RedHawks. They compete in the Mid-American Conference in all varsity sports except ice hockey, which competes in the National Collegiate Hockey Conference.

History

Old Miami (1809–1873)

The foundations for Miami University were first laid by an Act of Congress signed by President George Washington, stating an academy should be Northwest of the Ohio River in the Miami Valley. The land was within the Symmes Purchase; Judge John Cleves Symmes, the land's owner, purchased it from the government with the stipulation that he set aside land for an academy. Congress granted one township to be in the District of Cincinnati to the Ohio General Assembly for the purposes of building a college, two days after Ohio was granted statehood in 1803; if no suitable location could be provided in the Symmes Purchase, Congress pledged to give federal lands to the legislature after a five-year period. The Ohio Legislature appointed three surveyors in August of the same year to search for a suitable township, and they selected a township off Four Mile Creek. The Legislature passed "An Act to Establish the Miami University" on February 2, 1809, and the state created a board of trustees; this is cited as the founding of Miami University. The township originally granted to the university was known as the "College Township," and was renamed Oxford, Ohio, in 1810.

The university temporarily halted construction due to the War of 1812. Cincinnati tried—and failed—to move Miami to the city in 1822 and to divert its income to a Cincinnati college. Miami created a grammar school in 1818 to teach frontier youth, but it was disbanded after five years. Robert Hamilton Bishop, a Presbyterian minister and professor of history, was appointed to be the first President of Miami University in 1824. The first day of classes at Miami was on November 1, 1824. At its opening, there were 20 students and two faculty members in addition to Bishop. The curriculum included Greek, Latin, Algebra, Geography, and Roman history; the university offered only a Bachelor of Arts. An "English Scientific Department" was started in 1825, which studied modern languages, applied mathematics, and political economy as training for more practical professions. It offered a certificate upon completion of coursework, not a diploma.

Miami students purchased a printing press, and in 1827 published their first periodical, The Literary Focus. It promptly failed, but it laid the foundation for the weekly Literary Register. The Miami Student, founded in 1867, traces its foundation back to the Literary Register and claims to be the oldest college newspaper in the United States. A theological department and a farmer's college were formed in 1829; the farmer's college was not an agricultural school, but a three-year education program for farm boys. William Holmes McGuffey joined the faculty in 1826, and began his work on the McGuffey Readers while in Oxford. By 1834 the faculty had grown to seven professors and enrollment was at 234 students. Eleven students were expelled in 1835, including one for firing a pistol at another student. McGuffey resigned and became the President of the Cincinnati College, where he urged parents not to send their children to Miami.

Alpha Delta Phi opened its chapter at Miami in 1833, making it the first fraternity chapter West of the Allegheny Mountains. In 1839, Beta Theta Pi was created; it was the first fraternity formed at Miami.

In 1839 Old Miami reached its enrollment peak, with 250 students from 13 states; only Harvard, Yale, and Dartmouth were larger. President Bishop resigned in 1840 due to escalating problems in the university, although he remained as a professor through 1844. He was replaced as president by George Junkin, former President of Lafayette College; Junkin resigned in 1844, having proved to be unpopular with students. By 1847, enrollment had fallen to 137 students.

Students in 1848 participated in the "Snowball Rebellion". Defying the faculty's stance against fraternities, students packed Old Main, one of Miami's main classrooms and administrative buildings, with snow and reinforced the snow with chairs, benches and desks from the classroom. Those who had participated in the rebellion were expelled from the school and Miami's student population was more than halved. By 1873, enrollment fell further to 87 students. The board of trustees closed the school in 1873, and leased the campus for a grammar school. The period before its closing is referred to as "Old Miami."

New Miami (1885–present)

The university reopened in 1885, having paid all of its debts and repaired many of its buildings; there were 40 students in its first year. Enrollment remained under 100 students throughout the 1800s. Miami focused on aspects outside of the classics, including botany, physics, and geology departments. In 1888, Miami began inter-collegiate football play in a game against the University of Cincinnati. By the early 1900s, the state of Ohio pledged regular financial support for Miami University. Enrollment reached 207 students in 1902. The Ohio General Assembly passed the Sesse Bill in 1902, which mandated coeducation for all Ohio public schools. Miami lacked the rooms to fit all of the students expected the next year, and Miami made an arrangement with Oxford College, a women's college in the town, to rent rooms.

In 1902, the Ohio legislature also authorized the establishment of the Ohio State Normal School "to provide proper theoretical and practical training for all students desiring to prepare themselves for the work of teaching." The normal school was Miami's first professional college and would evolve into the College of Education, Health, and Society. Miami's first African-American student, Nelly Craig, graduated from the Ohio State Normal School in 1905. Hepburn Hall, built in 1905, was the first women's dorm at the college. By 1907, the enrollment at the university passed 700 students and women made up about a third of the student body. Andrew Carnegie pledged $40,000 to help build a new library for the university. The McGuffey Laboratory School opened in 1910 and was soon housed with the teacher preparation students in the new McGuffey Hall, completed in 1917. McGuffey Hall was named to honor William Holmes McGuffey, author of the McGuffey Readers textbook series.

Enrollment in 1923 was at 1,500 students. In 1928, Miami founded the School of Business Administration and acquired the Oxford College for Women. The next year, the School of Fine Arts was established. By the early 1930s, enrollment had reached 2,200 students. The conservative environment found on campus called for little change during the problems of the Great Depression, and only about 10 percent of students in the 1930s were on government subsidies. During World War II, Miami changed its curriculum to include "war emergency courses" and a Navy Training School took up residence on campus. During wartime in 1943, the population of the university became majority women. Due to the G.I. Bill, tuition for veterans decreased; the enrollment at Miami jumped from 2,200 to 4,100 students. Temporary lodges were constructed to accommodate the number of students. By 1952, the student body had grown to 5,000.

In 1954, Miami created a common curriculum for all students to complete to have a base for their other subjects. By 1964, enrollment reached nearly 15,000. To accommodate the growing number of students, Miami University opened its first regional campuses at Middletown, Ohio, in 1966 and Hamilton, Ohio, in 1968. Miami founded the Dolibois European Center in Luxembourg in 1968, which would move to Differdange Castle in 1997; it is home to a study abroad program where students live with Luxembourgish host families and study under Miami professors. Miami experimented with a trimester plan in 1965, but it ultimately failed and the university reverted to a quarter system. On April 15, 1970, a student sit-in at Rowan Hall, home of Miami's Naval ROTC program, in opposition to the Vietnam War resulted in 176 students being arrested. Edgar W. King Library was completed in 1972. In 1974, the Western College for Women in Oxford was sold to Miami, and President Phillip Shriver oversaw the creation of an interdisciplinary studies college known as the Western College Program. The program was merged into the College of Arts & Science in 2007.

Responding to the Miami Tribe of Oklahoma, trustees changed the athletic teams nickname from the "Redskins" to the "RedHawks" in 1997. The School of Engineering and Applied Science (later College of Engineering and Computing) was created from the former School of Applied Science in 2003. The Farmer School of Business building was completed on the East Quad in 2009. The newest regional campus, the Miami University Voice of America Learning Center also opened in 2009 in West Chester. In 2014, the Armstrong Student Center was completed to replace the Shriver Center, which was repurposed. All campuses were closed in March 2020 due to the COVID-19 pandemic, reopening partially that fall. Also in 2020, Miami began revitalizing its research programs and academic offerings as part of the MiamiRISE plan. This included the establishment of the Honors College in 2021.

Campuses

Oxford

Miami University's main campus is in Oxford, Ohio; the city is in the Miami Valley in southwestern Ohio, about 30 miles (48 km) from Cincinnati and 34 miles (55 km) from Dayton. Development of the campus began in 1818 with a multipurpose building called Franklin Hall; Elliott Hall, built in 1825, is Miami's oldest standing building and residence hall. Miami is renowned for its campus beauty, having been called "The most beautiful campus that ever there was" by Pulitzer Prize-winning poet Robert Frost, a friend of then Miami artist-in-residence Percy MacKaye, a poet. Miami has added campus buildings, such as the Farmer School of Business building, in the style characteristic of Georgian Revival architecture, with all buildings built three stories or less, or "to human scale". Today, the area of Miami's Oxford campus consists of 2,138 acres (8 km2).

Oxford, Ohio is a college town, with over 70.0% of the residents attending college or graduate school. Forbes ranked the city of Oxford first on its 2016 list of the best college towns in the United States. All first and second year students are required to live on campus and all dorms are three stories with basement levels. Miami University's dining options includes about 30 dining destinations on campus, including the Bell Tower Commons, Garden Commons, MapleStreet Station, Martin Commons and Western Commons dining halls, each with multiple dining options. Miami's dining services have won 52 awards since 2004. Miami University also has a Recreational Sports Center. The center has three basketball courts, an Olympic-sized pool and diving well, outdoor pursuit center, rock-climbing center, fitness room, large exercise classrooms and a weight room.

There are four museums on campus, including the Miami University Art Museum, William Holmes McGuffey Museum, and the Karl Limper Geology Museum. The Hefner Museum of Natural History, in Upham Hall, features displays of many hoofed animals and other animal mounts, shells, corals and sponges, skeletons and fossils.

Academic buildings
The original portion of campus starts at the intersection of South Campus Avenue and East High Street, where the Phi Delta Theta Gates lead into the slant walk path. In this area are the oldest academic buildings, including Hall Auditorium (Philosophy) and McGuffey Hall (Education, Family Science, Social Work), built in 1909, and Alumni Hall (Architecture), built in 1910. King Library and Harrison Hall (Political Science) are also in this area. Going eastward along East Spring Street are Irvin Hall (Classics, World Languages) and Kreger Hall (Physics) before the Armstrong Student Center, the largest building on campus. Surrounding Bishop Woods are Shideler Hall (Geography, Geology), Upham Hall (Anthropology, Comparative Religion, History, Sociology and Gerontology, Statistics), Laws Hall (Emerging Technology in Business + Design), and Hughes Laboratories (Chemistry and Biochemistry).

Buildings north of East High Street begin at the McVey Data Science Building site on Tallawanda Road. Going eastward is the campus of the College of Engineering and Computing, which includes Benton Hall (Computer Science, Software Engineering), Garland Hall, and the Engineering Building. Around North Patterson Avenue are Pearson Hall (Biology, Microbiology), the Psychology Building, and the Farmer School of Business building (Accountancy, Economics, Finance, Information Systems and Analytics, Management, Marketing).

There are four streets south of East Spring Street with academic buildings. On South Campus Avenue is the Clinical Health Sciences and Wellness facility. On Oak Street are Williams Hall (Media, Journalism, and Film) and Phillips Hall (Kinesiology and Health), in between Spring and Maple Street is McMillan Hall (Global & Intercultural Studies), and between Maple and South Patterson Avenue are the Shriver Center, Hiestand Hall (Art) and the Art Building, and the Center for Performing Arts  (Music, Theatre). Also along Patterson Avenue is Bachelor Hall (English, Mathematics) before the entrance to Western Campus. Western Campus includes Boyd Hall, Hoyt Hall (IT Services), Peabody Hall (Honors College), and Presser Hall (Music).

Historic landmarks
 William Holmes McGuffey Museum, a National Historic Landmark
 Zachariah Price Dewitt Cabin, listed on the National Register of Historic Places
 Elliott and Stoddard Halls, oldest dormitories in use in Ohio
 Langstroth Cottage, a National Historic Landmark
 Old Manse (home of the Office of ASPIRE) Presbyterian Parsonage, East High Street, listed in the Historic American Buildings Survey
 Simpson-Shade Guest House, listed in the Historic American Buildings Survey
 Lewis Place, home of Miami presidents

King Library

Edgar W. King Library was originally named the King Undergraduate Library when the south section was completed in 1966. When the north section was completed in 1972, the word "undergraduate" was dropped from its name. Prior to the construction of King Library, Alumni Library was the main university library. When King Library was completed in 1972, Alumni Library was changed to Alumni Hall. King Library is home to Miami University Libraries’ humanities, government, law, and social sciences collections as well as the Walter Havighurst Special Collections and university archives. It additionally houses King Café, the Center for Information Management, the Center for Digital Scholarship, a makerspace, and the Howe Writing Center.

In addition to King Library, the university's library system also includes the Amos Music Library in the Center for Performing Arts and the Wertz Art & Architecture Library in Alumni Hall on the Oxford campus, as well as the Rentschler Library at Miami University Hamilton and the Gardner-Harvey Library at Miami University Middletown.

Other campuses

Regional campuses
 Miami University Middletown, located in Middletown. Founded in 1966, this is Ohio's first regional campus.
 Miami University Hamilton, located in Hamilton. Founded in 1968. 
 Miami University Voice of America Learning Center, located in West Chester. Founded in 2009, this campus houses the Farmer School of Business MBA program.

Miami's regional campuses are non-residential and offer a handful of bachelor's degrees, associate degrees, one certificate program, as well as beginning course work for most four-year degrees, and the MBA and MEd programs at Oxford. Combined, Miami's regional campuses enroll 4,664 students. Middletown and Hamilton compete in independent sports as members of the Ohio Regional Campus Conference, competing under the monikers "Middletown ThunderHawks" and "Hamilton Harriers".

Dolibois European Center

The Dolibois European Center in Differdange, Luxembourg is included as a study abroad option for students, and only houses about 125 students per semester. It offers continuing classes pertaining to students' studies in Oxford, typically in architecture, business, French, German, history, and political science. Students live in homestays with Luxembourgish host families, and are encouraged to travel throughout Europe over weekends as well as through university-led study programs. The campus was originally based in Luxembourg City from its founding in 1968 until 1997, when it moved to Differdange Castle in the southwestern part of the country.

Academics

Admissions

Undergraduate 

Miami University extends offers of admission to applicants after holistic review that includes examination of academic rigor and performance, admissions test scores, personal essays, and recommendations. The 2022 annual ranking of U.S. News & World Report categorizes Miami University-Oxford as "more selective." The Princeton Review gives Miami University an "Admissions Selectivity Rating" of 84.

For the Class of 2025 (enrolled fall 2021), Miami University received 29,990 applications and accepted 26,571 (88.6%). Of those accepted, 4,519 enrolled, a yield rate (the percentage of accepted students who choose to attend the university) of 17.0%. Miami University's freshman retention rate is 89.2%, with 83% going on to graduate within six years.

The enrolled first-year class of 2025 had the following standardized test scores: the middle 50% range (25th percentile-75th percentile) of SAT scores was 1180-1350, while the middle 50% range of ACT scores was 24-30. 

Miami University is a college-sponsor of the National Merit Scholarship Program and sponsored 21 Merit Scholarship awards in 2020. In the 2020–2021 academic year, 28 freshman students were National Merit Scholars.

Rankings

U.S. News & World Report, in its 2021 rankings, ranked the university's undergraduate program 103rd among all national universities, and 46th among public national universities. U.S. News also ranks Miami University 3rd for "Best Undergraduate Teaching" and places Miami as the 3rd best research university in Ohio, after Case Western Reserve University and Ohio State University.

Kiplinger's Personal Finance magazine listed Miami as one of the "100 Best Values in Public Colleges" for 2015, ranking Miami 55th nationally. Miami University has appeared on the list since it was first published in 1998. Forbes ranked Miami 155th in the United States among all colleges and universities and listed it as one of "America's Best College Buys".

In March 2014, BusinessWeek ranked the undergraduate business program for the Farmer School of Business at 23rd among all U.S. undergraduate business schools and was ranked 8th among public schools. Entrepreneur ranked Miami's Institute for Entrepreneurship in its top ten undergraduate programs in the nation. The Wall Street Journal ranked Miami 22nd among state schools for bringing students directly from undergraduate studies into top graduate programs. The Journal also ranked Miami's accelerated MBA program ninth globally. Miami's accountancy program received high marks from the Public Accounting Report's rankings of accountancy programs; its undergraduate and graduate programs ranked 17th and 20th respectively.

In 1985, Richard Moll wrote a book about America's premier public universities where he describes Miami as one of America's original eight "Public Ivies", along with the University of California, University of Michigan, University of Virginia, College of William and Mary, University of Texas, University of Vermont, and the University of North Carolina.

Miami also receives high marks for its campus. Newsweek rated Miami at 19th in its 2012 list of Most Beautiful Schools and poet Robert Frost described it as "The most beautiful campus that ever there was."

Undergraduate and graduate programs
Miami is a large, primarily residential teaching university with a focus on undergraduate studies. 
The university offers more than 100 majors, 48 minors, and 11 co-majors.

Miami University has seven academic divisions:
 College of Arts and Science
 Farmer School of Business
 College of Creative Arts
 College of Education, Health, and Society
 College of Engineering and Computing
 Graduate School
 College of Liberal Arts and Applied Science (Miami Regionals)

The College of Arts and Science (or CAS) is the oldest and largest college at Miami, with almost half of the undergraduate student body enrollment. The CAS offers 70 majors covering a broad range of areas of study, including biological sciences, cultural studies, history, philosophy, religion, law and public policy, literature and writing, mathematics, physical sciences, media and communications, health sciences, social sciences, and world languages. The curriculum emphasizes creativity, research, and global perspectives. 10 of the 12 doctoral degrees offered by Miami are provided through the College of Arts & Science.

Miami's Farmer School of Business is a nationally recognized school of business that offers 9 majors. The school also offers graduate MBA, accountancy, and economics degrees. The Farmer School of Business (or FSB) is housed in a  state-of-the-art, LEED-certified building. The FSB building, opened for classes in 2009, was designed by leading revivalist architect Robert A.M. Stern.

The College of Education, Health & Society offers 20 undergraduate majors spanning six departments, which include Educational Leadership, Educational Psychology, Family Science & Social Work, Kinesiology and Health, Sports Leadership and Management, and Teacher Education. As of fall 2009, nearly 3,500 full-time and part-time undergraduates were enrolled in the school.

The College of Engineering and Computing offers 10 accredited majors at the Oxford campus, and moved into a new $22 million engineering building in 2007. The college has five departments, including Chemical, Paper, and Biomedical Engineering; Computer Science and Software Engineering; Electrical and Computer Engineering; Mechanical and Manufacturing Engineering; and Interdisciplinary programs. The school also offers four master's degrees in computer science, chemical engineering, computational electrical and computer engineering, and mechanical engineering.

Miami's College of Creative Arts offers 14 majors through its five departments: Architecture and Interior Design, Art, Emerging Technology in Business & Design, Music, and Theatre. Each department has its own admission requirements, either a portfolio or audition, which are separate from the standard admissions requirements for the university. Art majors choose a concentration in areas such as ceramics, metals, photography, printmaking, sculpture, graphic design, and interior design. Music majors specify either music performance, music education, or music composition, and choose their focus, whether instrumental or vocal.

Miami offers master's degrees in more than 50 areas of study and doctoral degrees in 12, the largest of which are doctoral degrees in psychology. To enroll in graduate courses, students must first be accepted into the Graduate School, and then into the department through which the degree is offered. Although tuition for the Graduate School is roughly the same as for an undergraduate degree, most of the graduate programs offer graduate assistantships as well as tuition waivers.

The Miami University Honors College was established in 2021 as part of the MiamiRISE strategic plan, replacing the former honors program on campus. Around 400 students are admitted to the Honors College every year and are required to produce publishable research. The Honors College is Miami's only residential college and fosters one-on-one interaction with faculty-in-residence.

Administration

An elected Board of Trustees oversees administration of the university and holds subcommittees on investment, finance and audit, and academic and student affairs. This includes oversight on programs offered by the university and financial expenditures.

The Office of the President manages Miami University's fiscal and business operations, supporting the academic and research missions across all campuses. The office works with the board of trustees to set the vision, direction, and priorities of the university, in addition to serving as a university figurehead and liaison. The 22nd and current president is Dr. Gregory P. Crawford, who entered the role in 2016. Crawford previously served as vice president and Associate Provost at the University of Notre Dame, Dean of the College of Science at Notre Dame, and as Dean of Engineering at Brown University.

Other administrative departments include that of the Provost and Executive Vice President for Academic Affairs, which includes the deans of each of the eight academic colleges and the Dolibois European Center. The Senior Vice President for Finance and Business Services and Treasurer's department oversees university finances, procurement, and audits. The office of the Vice President for Student Life, Senior Vice President for University Advancement, Vice President for Information Technology, and Senior Vice President for Enrollment Management round out the university's administrative faculty.

Student life

Student body 

As of 2020, Miami University has a total enrollment of 22,971 admitted students. The Oxford campus encompasses 18,669 students, of which 16,522 are at the undergraduate and 2,147 at the graduates and professional. Within offers for admission in fall 2021, 44% of students were from Ohio, with offers for students from all 50 U.S. states, the District of Columbia and 122 countries abroad. Miami University encompasses 1,614 international students from 67 countries. Of the regularly enrolled international students, the most represented countries are typically China, Vietnam, India, Nepal, and South Korea. With a gender distribution of 49% male students and 51% female students, Miami University's gender disparity between men and women is far below the national average, making it one of the most equally balanced undergraduate institutions in the United States. Ethnic diversity at Miami University is low among public universities in the United States. The student body at Miami University remains predominantly white, despite efforts to recruit more minority students. Miami University ranked 95th out of 100 national universities for academics by diversity and as of Fall 2016, it had the lowest percentage of domestic students of color among all five major public universities in Ohio.

Student-run organizations 

For the 2017–18 academic year, Miami had over 600 registered student organizations. These clubs and organizations run the gamut from varsity sports clubs to professional fraternities, from political and religious groups to fashion, theatre and LGBTQ+ organizations. The university recognizes the Associated Student Government (ASG) that represents student interests to faculty, administrators, and the Ohio Legislature. It is the official student government of Miami University. It has an executive branch run by a student president and 14 members of the executive cabinet who work with administrators in all areas of student life as well as academics, a legislative branch made up of 50 senators who voice student concerns, write and vote on legislation on a weekly basis and the judicial branch, made up of 17 undergraduate students who compose the student court that hears cases involving violations of the student code, and ensures that students are aware of their legal rights.

The Miami University Marching Band is the largest student organization on campus, typically fielding around 250 to 275 students. It represents the college at all home football games, as well as at various away games, bowl games, parades, and marching band festivals.

In 2018, Miami's mock trial program won its second national American Mock Trial Association championship title, beating Yale University in the final round, leading them to be ranked first out of over 700 university teams across the country for the upcoming 2018–19 season.

Media organizations 
Miami has a variety of media outlets. The student-run newspaper, The Miami Student, claims to have been founded in 1826, which would make it the oldest university newspaper in the United States. However, the first issue is dated May 1867, and the paper refers to itself as "the oldest college newspaper west of the Alleghenies." The Miami Student Magazine is a sister publication to the newspaper. The bi-annual publication includes feature writing and short stories. The undergraduate literature and art magazine, Inklings, is available in print and online. RedHawk Radio (WMSR) is Miami's only student radio station. Miami University Television (MUTV) is available on cable in Oxford, Ohio. UP Magazine is Miami's student-run fashion magazine that publishes an issue each semester and also maintains a blog. Hate & Dishonor is a satirical publication at Miami, with the name parodying the Miami code of values known as Love and Honor.

Miami University Men's Glee Club 

Aside from the university's student newspaper, the university's oldest and longest-running academic student organization is the Miami University Men's Glee Club. Founded in 1907 by professor Raymond H. Burke, composer of Miami's fight song and alma mater, the glee club is among the oldest and largest groups of its kind in the nation. It is composed of over 100 singers selected by audition from all academic disciplines. The group's repertoire ranges from Gregorian Chant and Renaissance motets to folksongs, popular music, and spirituals. The Glee Club performs three concerts, in fall, winter, and spring each year at Miami's Hall Auditorium, constructed in 1907–8. The fall semester concerts are paired with Miami's large mixed choir, Collegiate Chorale. In addition to these, the Glee Club will often perform at Miami University events, local churches, and high schools in the greater Ohio area.

The Glee Club has also performed with major symphony orchestras at a regional and national level; most frequently with the Cincinnati Symphony Orchestra. Throughout its history, the Glee Club has worked with renowned composers, conductors and singers such as Morten Lauridsen, Martina Arroyo, Max Rudolf, Thomas Schippers, Paul Salamunovich, A.R. Rahman, and most recently Italian tenor Alessandro Brustenghi. In 2014, the Glee Club performed a Memorial Day service at the Normandy American Cemetery and Memorial, as part of its biannual international tour, and later won the First European Prize with Great Distinction at the Concours Europeen de Chant Choral 2014 (European Choir Competition).

The Glee Club also hosts one men's a cappella singing group, The Cheezies. This group consists of approximately 15 members auditioned from the Glee Club.

Residential life 

Residential life is a primary characteristic of the undergraduate education at Miami University and is embedded in the university's Mission Statement. Miami University requires first and second year students to live on campus. Elliott and Stoddard Halls are two of the oldest remaining buildings on campus today. Built in 1828 and 1835 respectively, they continue to be used as dormitories and are considered two of the most prestigious dorms to live in. They are also listed on the National Register of Historic Places. The campus has a total of 46 residence halls, the newest of which opened in 2018. The residence halls are organized into eight quads throughout campus:

 Academic Quad: Bishop Hall, Elliott Hall, Ogden Hall, Stoddard Hall, Wells Hall
 Central Quad: Hamilton Hall, MacCracken Hall, Maplestreet Station, Minnich Hall, Richard Hall, Scott Hall
 East Quad: Collins Hall, Dennison Hall, Dorsey Hall, McBride Hall, Miami Inn, Symmes Hall. Previously: Wilson Hall
 Heritage Commons: Blanchard House, Fisher Hall, Logan Lodge, Pines Lodge, Reid Hall, Tallawanda Hall
 North Quad: Brandon Hall, Flower Hall, Hahne Hall, Hepburn Hall, Marcum Hall, McFarland Hall, Withrow Hall
 South Quad: Anderson Hall, Dodds Hall, Emerson Hall, Etheridge Hall, Morris Hall, Porter Hall, Stanton Hall, Tappan Hall
 Western Campus: Clawson Hall, Havighurst Hall, Hillcrest Hall, McKee Hall, Peabody Hall, Stonebridge Hall, Thomson Hall, Young Hall

Within its existing residential life programs, Miami offers students the option of choosing from 35 theme-based living learning communities (LLCs). All first-year residential halls on campus participate in the LLC program to create bonds among students based on their field of study and shared interests. In an LLC, students are co-enrolled into one or more classes, which further support student's transition into the university's liberal arts education. Smaller groups of students may also create their second year LLC to further their learning together.

Each residence hall has various resident assistants (RAs) who are full-time enrolled students that assist the Office of Residence Life to promote community engagement, enforce hall and university policies, submit residence hall reports, and promote academic success. Residence halls also have representatives that participate collectively in the Residence Hall Association and the student senate.

Greek life

Miami has 21 active sorority and 30 active fraternity chapters. Miami is nicknamed the Mother of Fraternities for the number of fraternities that started on its campus: Beta Theta Pi (1839), Phi Delta Theta (1848), Sigma Chi (1855), and Phi Kappa Tau (1906). However, Alpha Delta Phi (1832) was the first fraternity on campus. Delta Zeta, founded in 1902, is the only sorority alpha chapter on campus. The Miami Triad refers to the first three fraternities founded at Miami: Beta Theta Pi, Phi Delta Theta, and Sigma Chi. The Triad is sometimes celebrated with parties at other universities such as the University of Kansas.

As of the fall of 2017, there were 2,556 sorority members and 1,544 fraternity members. Miami hosts about 50 different fraternities and sororities governed by three different student governing councils. Miami's fraternities and sororities hold many philanthropy events and community fundraisers. In the 2017 fall semester, the Greek community recorded 11,847 service hours and raised $96,839 for philanthropic causes.

Miami University's office of Greek affairs was endowed with a $1 million gift from Cliff Alexander, a Miami University alumnus and a member of Sigma Nu; Miami believes this gift will support the Greek program well into the next century.

A spate of sorority sanctions in the 2009–10 school year reached national news. Sorority members of Miami's Alpha Xi Delta chapter and their dates at a formal held at the National Underground Railroad Freedom Center urinated throughout the venue, swore at staff, and attempted to steal drinks from the bar; one other incident involving the Pi Beta Phi chapter at Miami involved similar behavior. Former University President David Hodge called the behavior "deeply troubling" and "embarrassing", and vowed "we are determined to live up to our values" in response to the incidents.

More recently, Miami's Greek system has come under fire for numerous hazing and alcohol violations. Multiple Greek organizations have been suspended in recent years, including Kappa Sigma, Phi Kappa Psi, Sigma Alpha Epsilon, Phi Kappa Tau (Alpha chapter), Pi Kappa Phi, Pi Beta Phi, Sigma Nu, and Zeta Beta Tau. In late 2015 three fraternities (Sigma Nu, Phi Kappa Psi and Kappa Sigma) were evicted from Miami University. Among the violations was encouraging pledges to drink 100 beers and pose for inappropriate social media pictures. In other instances, pledges were subjected to hours-long, early-morning workouts, and forbidden to shower or shave. In 2019, Miami's Delta Tau Delta chapter was suspended until 2034 due to hazing and violations of Miami's student conduct code, and its national charter was revoked.

Miami Mergers 
When two students meet at Miami, enter into a relationship, and then get married, they are called "Miami Mergers." Once graduated, the couple can register with the university's Alumni Association. According to the Josh Chapin, 14,406 Miami Merger couples received a Valentine’s Day card from the association in 2022; this annual tradition started over 40 years ago.

Athletics 

Miami's National Collegiate Athletic Association (NCAA) Division I sports teams are called the RedHawks; the program offers 18 varsity sports for men and women. They compete in the Mid-American Conference (MAC) in all varsity sports except ice hockey, which competes in the National Collegiate Hockey Conference.

Miami's athletic teams were called the Miami Boys, the Big Reds, the Reds, or the Red and Whites until 1928 when Miami Publicity Director R.J. McGinnis coined the nickname "Redskins". The athletic teams were known as the Redskins up through 1996 when the Miami Tribe of Oklahoma, which works with the university on Native American relations, withdrew its support for the nickname. The board of trustees voted to change the nickname to the RedHawks in 1997.

The current athletic director is David Sayler, who was hired to the position in December 2012.

Football

Miami is nicknamed the "Cradle of Coaches" for the coaches that have trained through its football program, including Hall of Fame inductees Paul Brown, Carmen Cozza, Weeb Ewbank, Ara Parseghian, Earl Blaik, Woody Hayes, Bo Schembechler, and Jim Tressel, to name some from a selection of over 80. Ben Roethlisberger, a quarterback from Miami, has gone on to be a two-time Super Bowl winning quarterback for the Pittsburgh Steelers. Two former players, John Harbaugh (defensive back) and Sean McVay (wide receiver) coached their respective teams to victories in Super Bowl XLVII and Super Bowl LVI, with McVay becoming the youngest head coach to win the Super Bowl at age 36.

Miami's football team plays in Yager Stadium, a 24,286-seat football stadium on campus; they formerly played in the now demolished Miami Field. The current head coach is Chuck Martin, who was named head coach December 3, 2013. The RedHawks compete each year against the Cincinnati Bearcats for the Victory Bell, a tradition that dates back to 1888. The Battle of the Bricks is also played annually against the Ohio Bobcats. The RedHawks are 707–473–44 overall and 8–5 in bowl games as of the 2021 season, and have secured 22 conference titles.

Basketball

The Miami men's basketball team has appeared in 17 NCAA basketball championship tournaments, reaching the Sweet Sixteen four times, most recently in 1999. Notable former student-athletes have included Randy Ayers, Ron Harper, Wally Szczerbiak, and Wayne Embry.

The team competes in Millett Hall and is coached by Travis Steele.

Men's ice hockey

Miami's men's varsity ice hockey team started in 1978 coached by Steve Cady. The RedHawks made the NCAA national title game in 2009, but lost in overtime to Boston University after leading much of the game. In 2019, head coach Enrico Blasi (Total record: 398-311-76) was fired after 20 seasons with the team. Despite his success with the program, the RedHawks did not have a winning record since 2015.

Since the Mid-American Conference does not include Division I men's ice hockey, Miami competed in the Central Collegiate Hockey Association (CCHA) through the 2012–2013 season. It was one of three schools from the MAC in the CCHA along with Bowling Green State University and Western Michigan University. However, starting with the 2013–2014 season, Miami and Western Michigan began competing in the National Collegiate Hockey Conference.

The men's ice hockey team plays at the Goggin Ice Center. The center has two rinks: a practice rink, and Steve Cady Arena, which is used by the hockey team. The arena has a seating capacity of 3,200, and replaced the Goggin Ice Arena in 2006.

Synchronized skating

Miami's synchronized skating team began in August 1977 as a "Precision Skating Club" at Goggin Ice Center. The program achieved varsity status by 1996. The Miami University senior synchronized skating team are the 1999, 2006, and 2009 U.S. national champions. Miami won a silver medal at the 2007 World Championships, the first medal ever won by Team USA for synchronized skating. The collegiate-level team has won 18 national titles; Miami created a junior-varsity level team beneath the senior level. Vicki Korn, after serving as the coach of Miami's program for 25 years, announced her retirement in May 2009. The head coach is Carla DeGirolamo. A 2003 graduate of Miami, she skated with the program all four of her undergraduate years and then spent seven seasons as an assistant coach.

Wrestling
At one time Miami had a very competitive wrestling program. They won eight Mid-American Conference titles (1961, 1964, 1965, 1967, 1968, 1984, 1991 and 1992) and produced 51 NCAA qualifiers who earned 81 qualifications to the NCAA Division I tournament. Seven of their wrestlers earned All American status with HWT Mike Holcomb placing twice (5th in 1982, 3rd in 1984).

In 1999, Miami eliminated the wrestling program, along with men's golf and tennis, to better comply with Title IX regulations (female students made up 54% of campus but only 29% of athletes). Several members of the cut teams then sued the university president, athletic director and board of trustees, alleging that the removal of the teams violated their Fourteenth Amendment and Title IX protections. Enlisting the help of the Center for Individual Rights, the students took their case to the United States District Court for the Southern District of Ohio, where a district judge denied their claims. The students appealed to the United States Court of Appeals for the Sixth Circuit, where two judges affirmed the district court's ruling, stating, "We find that the plaintiffs wholly failed to state either an equal protection claim or a claim under Title IX, and that the district court's denial of the motion for class certification was within the court's sound discretion."

Alumni

Miami alumni are active through various organizations and events such as Alumni Weekend. The Alumni Association has active chapters in over 50 cities. A number of Miami alumni have made significant contributions in the fields of government, law, science, academia, business, arts, journalism, and athletics, among others.

Benjamin Harrison, the 23rd President of the United States, graduated from Miami in 1852. Four Governors of Ohio graduated from Miami, including Charles Anderson (27th), James E. Campbell (38th), Andrew L. Harris (44th), and Mike DeWine (70th), who also served as a U.S. Senator for Ohio. Chung Un-chan, the 36th Prime Minister of South Korea, received his master's degree from Miami in economics in 1972. Other politicians include U.S. Senator Maria Cantwell of Washington, U.S. House of Representatives Speaker Paul Ryan of Wisconsin, and U.S. Representative Susan Brooks of Indiana.

Rita Dove, a Pulitzer Prize winner and the first African-American United States Poet Laureate, graduated summa cum laude from Miami. Political satirist and journalist P.J. O'Rourke graduated from Miami in 1969.

Prominent alumni in business include Brian Niccol, CEO of Chipotle, Marne Levine, Chief Business Officer at Facebook, C. Michael Armstrong, former chairman/CEO of AT&T, former chairman/CEO of Hughes Aircraft Co., and former chairman of the President's Export Council, Arthur D. Collins, Jr., former chairman/CEO of Medtronic, Inc., and Richard T. Farmer, founder/CEO emeritus of Cintas.

In sports, Chris Rose is a studio host with the MLB Network and NFL Network. John Harbaugh, head coach of the Baltimore Ravens, and Sean McVay, head coach of the Los Angeles Rams, both played football for Miami. Paul Brown, the partial founder of both the Cleveland Browns and the Cincinnati Bengals and a head coach for both teams graduated from the class of 1930. 
Miami alumni that play in professional sports leagues include Dan Boyle of the NHL, Andy Greene of the NHL, Ryan Jones of the NHL, Alec Martinez of the NHL, Reilly Smith of the NHL, Jeff Zatkoff of the NHL, Hayley Williams of the Russian Women's Hockey League, John Ely of the MLB, Adam Eaton of the MLB, golfer Brad Adamonis, Milt Stegall of the CFL, 2002 NBA All-Star Wally Szczerbiak, and NFL players Brandon Brooks, Quinten Rollins, Zac Dysert, and two-time Super Bowl-winning quarterback Ben Roethlisberger.

See also

 Miami University Press
 Cradle of Coaches
 Green Beer Day
 Harker's Run  
 Miami Tribe of Oklahoma
 Mother of Fraternities

Notes

References

Further reading

External links 

 
 Miami University Athletics website

Buildings and structures of Miami University
 
Public universities and colleges in Ohio
Greater Cincinnati Consortium of Colleges and Universities
Education in Butler County, Ohio
Buildings and structures in Butler County, Ohio
Tourist attractions in Butler County, Ohio
Educational institutions established in 1809
Universities and colleges accredited by the Higher Learning Commission